The Exile (also known in English by the title The Undesirable) is a 1914 Hungarian silent film directed by Michael Curtiz.

Preservation status
Once thought lost, the film was discovered in the Hungarian House cultural center in New York and returned to Hungary for restoration. It was released on DVD and blu-ray in the US on 19 January 2016 by Olive Films under the title The Undesirable.

References

External links

1914 films
Films directed by Michael Curtiz
Hungarian silent feature films
Hungarian black-and-white films
1910s rediscovered films
Hungarian drama films
1914 drama films
Rediscovered Hungarian films
Austro-Hungarian films
Silent drama films